Eva Bednářová (May 8, 1937 – December 6, 1986) was a Czech printmaker and illustrator.

Born in Prague, Bednářová was a graduate of the University of Applied Arts in that city. Throughout her career she produced illustrations for more than 40 books over three decades. Her illustrations for Chinese Fairy Tales by Dana and Milada Šťovíčková won the Grand Prix at the Biennial of Illustration Bratislava in 1969. Two of her prints are in the collection of the National Gallery of Art; she is also represented in the collection of the University of Iowa Stanley Museum of Art.

Select Bibliography 

 Hermína Frankova, Blázni a Pythagoras. Dívčí román. (Ilustrovala Eva Bednářová.). Praha, 1966.

 Olga Scheinpflugová, Pohádky.  (ilustrovala Eva Bednářová). Praha : Mladá fronta, 1971
 Dana and Milada Št́ovíčková (retold by) and translated into English by Alice Denešová , Chinese Fairy Tales. (illustrated by Eva Bednářová). Feltham : Hamlyn, 1969.

References

1937 births
1986 deaths
Czech printmakers
Women printmakers
Czech illustrators
Czech women illustrators
Artists from Prague
20th-century Czech artists
20th-century Czech printmakers
20th-century Czech women artists
Academy of Arts, Architecture and Design in Prague alumni